A maneuver enhancement brigade (MEB) is a self-contained, modular, and multifunctional support brigade of the United States Army customized to meet whatever mission it receives. A MEB's primary purpose is to plug into operational formations commanded by corps or division commanders, to support brigade combat teams once deployed, and to conduct tactical level tasks and support. MEBs can provide command and control for up to seven battalions that are capable of owning battlespace in combat. 

Battalions assigned to a MEB differ from mission to mission but their specialties typically do not repeat themselves more than twice for a certain type—when a mission dictates more than two of a certain type, the mission likely is not an MEB mission anymore but one more suited to a functional brigade. For example, if a mission calls for three engineer battalions, such mission is better suited to an engineer brigade.

Overview
The mission of a MEB is to provide critical maneuver support to the force commander, normally at the division level.  The MEB groups together a number of previously dispersed functions in order to achieve this mission.  Organic to the MEB is generally a headquarters and headquarters company, a signal company and a brigade support battalion.  This force can be augmented by combat engineer, military police, air defense, and/or CBRN defense units. Depending on the mission it may be assigned explosive ordnance disposal, civil affairs or a tactical combat force.  They are tailored with the capabilities required for each operation. More than one brigade may be assigned to a division or corps.

Maneuver enhancement brigades are designed to bridge the operational gap between brigade combat teams and functional support brigades. By modern doctrine MEB can control operational areas and are assigned a tactical combat force, usually in the form of a maneuver infantry battalion. A maneuver enhancement brigade primary goal is to provide the corps or divisional level commander with a field grade officer led formation that has a large headquarters, capable of controlling a mix of combat engineer, military police, level II medical services, communication units, NBC units and civil affair units. In addition to its attached maneuver combat battalion for security and rear area defense operations.

Unified combatant commanders may also attach these brigades directly to the Army service component command in order to serve in the theater army  rear area of operations or joint security area, where the MEB serves as the force protection unit for the US force headquarters.

There are 19 combat support brigades (maneuver enhancement) the Army plans to create, with 16 in the Army National Guard and 3 in the Army Reserve. This organization is one of five types of multifunctional support brigades that have been established under the transformation to the modular force. The other brigades are the sustainment brigade, battlefield surveillance brigade, combat aviation brigade, and fires brigade.

Maneuver enhancement brigades

Inactivated brigades 
 1st Maneuver Enhancement Brigade (1st MEB), active duty - inactivated 2015
 3rd Maneuver Enhancement Brigade (3rd MEB), active duty - inactivated 2011
 4th Maneuver Enhancement Brigade (4th MEB), active duty - inactivated 2015
 92nd Maneuver Enhancement Brigade (92nd MEB), Puerto Rico Army National Guard - became a military police brigade in 2016
 111th Maneuver Enhancement Brigade (111th MEB), New Mexico Army National Guard - became a sustainment brigade in 2016

Cancelled brigades 
 2nd Maneuver Enhancement Brigade, activation cancelled in 2010

Notes

References

Maneuver Enhancement Brigades of the United States Army